The women's middleweight boxing event at the 2020 Summer Olympics took place between 28 July and 8 August 2021 at the Ryōgoku Kokugikan. 17 boxers from 17 nations competed, Khadija El-Mardi from Morocco having withdrawn before the competition began.

The medals for the competition were presented by Battushig Batbold, Mongolia; IOC Member, and the medalists' bouquets were presented by Morinari Watanabe, Japan; BTF Chair.

Background
This was the third appearance of the women's middleweight event; the event has been held every Summer Games since the introduction of women's boxing in 2012. It has been at the 69–75 kg range each appearance.

Reigning World Champion Lauren Price of Great Britain won the event.

Light heavyweight World Champion Zemfira Magomedalieva of Russia also qualified at this weight (the middleweight is the heaviest Olympic women's class), and won a bronze medal. The 2012 and 2016 Olympic champion, Claressa Shields of the United States, turned professional and did not attempt to qualify.

Qualification

A National Olympic Committee (NOC) could enter only 1 qualified boxer in the weight class. There were 17 quota places available for the women's middleweight, allocated as follows:

 2 places at the 2020 African Boxing Olympic Qualification Tournament.
 4 places at the 2020 Asia & Oceania Boxing Olympic Qualification Tournament.
 4 places at the 2020 European Boxing Olympic Qualification Tournament.
 3 places that were intended to be awarded at the 2021 Pan American Boxing Olympic Qualification Tournament, which was cancelled. These places were instead awarded through the world ranking list to the top boxers from the Americas who had been registered for the qualification tournament.
 4 places that were intended to be awarded at a World Olympic Qualifying Tournament, which was cancelled. These places were instead awarded through the world ranking list, with one place for each continental zone (Africa, Asia & Oceania, Europe, Americas).

The host nation, Japan, was guaranteed a minimum of two places across the five women's boxing events; because Japan qualified boxers in the flyweight and featherweight through the Asia & Oceania tournament, no host places were used in any women's weight class. No Tripartite Commission invitation was used in this weight class.

Competition format
Like all Olympic boxing events, the competition is a straight single-elimination tournament. The competition begins with a preliminary round, where the number of competitors is reduced to 16, and concludes with a final. As there are fewer than 32 boxers in the competition, a number of boxers will receive a bye through the preliminary round. Both semifinal losers are awarded bronze medals.

Bouts consist of three three-minute rounds with a one-minute break between rounds. A boxer may win by knockout or by points. Scoring is on the "10-point-must" system, with 5 judges scoring each round. Judges consider "number of blows landed on the target areas, domination of the bout, technique and tactical superiority and competitiveness." Each judge determines a winner for each round, who receives 10 points for the round, and assigns the round's loser a number of points between 7 and 9 based on performance. The judge's scores for each round are added to give a total score for that judge. The boxer with the higher score from a majority of the judges is the winner.

Schedule
The middleweight starts with the round of 16 on 28 July. There are two rest days before the quarterfinals on 31 July, five more before the semifinals on 6 August, and one more before the final on 8 August.

Results

References

External links
Draw 

Boxing at the 2020 Summer Olympics
Women's events at the 2020 Summer Olympics